Dylan Kwesi Kobia Barkers (born 4 June 2000) is a Dutch professional footballer who plays as a midfielder for Maidstone United on loan from  club Cheltenham Town.

Playing career
On 2 August 2021, he signed a one-year contract with Cheltenham Town after impressing on trial.

On 14 January 2022, he joined Leamington on an initial one-month loan.

On 11 February 2022, he joined Gloucester City on a one-month loan.

On 30 September 2022, Barkers signed for National League club Maidstone United on a one-month loan deal.

Statistics

References

2000 births
Living people
Footballers from Rotterdam
Dutch footballers
Association football midfielders
Solihull Moors F.C. players
Guiseley A.F.C. players
Alvechurch F.C. players
Cheltenham Town F.C. players
Leamington F.C. players
Gloucester City A.F.C. players
Maidstone United F.C. players
National League (English football) players
Southern Football League players
English Football League players
Dutch expatriate footballers
Expatriate footballers in England